KSLT (107.1 MHz), is a radio station licensed to Spearfish, South Dakota, United States, serving Rapid City, South Dakota and the surrounding region with a Christian adult contemporary format. The station is currently owned by the University of Northwestern – St. Paul.

On October 24, 2011 KSLT moved from 107.3 FM to 107.1 FM.

An asset purchase agreement filed with the FCC on October 29, 2021 says Northwestern Media is buying KLMP/88.3 (Rapid City, South Dakota) and KSLT/107.1 (Spearfish-Rapid City, South Dakota) from Bethesda Christian Broadcasting for $249,000. The deal also includes KSLT satellites KSLP/90.3 (Pierre, South Dakota) and KSLS/90.7 (Dickinson, North Dakota) and boosters KLMP-1/KSLT-1 in Rapid City and translator K292DN in Newcastle, Wyoming. KLMP and KSLT fit in with Northwestern’s existing stations, which all carry either Adult Contemporary Christian or teaching and preaching from the Faith Radio Network. Bethesda Christian Broadcasting's KTPT (Rapid City, South Dakota) and KSLT/KSLP translators owned by the International Church of the Foursquare Gospel are not included in the transaction.

Northwestern Media closed on its purchase of KLMP/88.3 (Rapid City) and KSLT/107.1 (Spearfish-Rapid City) from Bethesda Christian Broadcasting on January 31, 2022.

Translators
KSLT is also heard on full power stations KSLP 90.3 in Fort Pierre, South Dakota and KSLS 90.7 in Dickinson, North Dakota, as well as five low powered translators in South Dakota, Nebraska, and Wyoming.

KSLS was previously the call sign of an FM radio station in Liberal, Kansas—part of the "LS Network" of radio entrepreneur Larry Steckline.  The Federal Communications Commission assigned the Kansas station the call sign KSLS on April 10, 1978, but changed its call sign to KSMM on February 15, 2008.

Full powered stations

Translators

Previous logo
 (KSLT's logo under previous 107.3 frequency)
 (KSLT's logo 2011-2020)

References

External links
KSLT website

SLT
SLT
Radio stations established in 1984
Lawrence County, South Dakota
1984 establishments in South Dakota